Cancer is a biweekly peer-reviewed scientific journal covering oncology. The journal was established in 1948. It is an official journal of the American Cancer Society and is published by Wiley-Blackwell on behalf of the society. The first editor-in-chief was Fred W. Stewart, who held that position until 1961. The current editor-in-chief is Suresh S. Ramalingam, and the previous one was Fadlo R. Khuri. Cancer Cytopathology was published as a section from 1997 until 2008, when it was split into a separate journal.

Abstracting and indexing
The journal is abstracted and indexed in:

According to the Journal Citation Reports, the journal has a 2015 impact factor of 5.649, ranking it 26th out of 211 journals in the category "Oncology".

References

Further reading

The Journal, referred to as Cancer Magazine, is included in the listing published here: 

Oncology journals
Publications established in 1948
Bimonthly journals
English-language journals
Wiley-Blackwell academic journals
Academic journals associated with learned and professional societies
American Cancer Society